Bryan Peter Rust (born May 11, 1992) is an American professional ice hockey right winger for the Pittsburgh Penguins of the National Hockey League (NHL). Rust was born in Pontiac, Michigan, but grew up in Troy, Michigan. He won back-to-back Stanley Cup championships with the Penguins in 2016 and 2017 and is the fourth longest tenured member of the organization aside from Sidney Crosby, Evgeni Malkin, and Kris Letang.

Playing career

Collegiate

As a youth, Rust played in the 2005 Quebec International Pee-Wee Hockey Tournament with the Detroit Honeybaked minor ice hockey team.

Rust played his collegiate career from 2010 to 2014 at the University of Notre Dame where he played a total of 161 games totaling 97 points. Rust finished his senior year as an alternate captain. Rust won a gold medal at the 2010 IIHF World U18 Championships for Team USA and the 2013 CCHA Tournament for Notre Dame. Rust was selected 80th overall in the third round of the 2010 NHL Entry Draft.

Professional

Rust made his AHL debut during the 2013–14 AHL season for the Wilkes-Barre/Scranton Penguins. Rust made his NHL debut on December 13, 2014 for the Pittsburgh Penguins in a game against the Columbus Blue Jackets where the Penguins lost to the Blue Jackets in a shootout. He would score his first NHL goal two nights later against Evgeni Nabokov of the Tampa Bay Lightning, on December 15, 2014.

Rust would enjoy a breakout year in 2016, due to injuries in the Penguins organization. After recording 8 points in 33 games in the 2015–16 season, Rust signed a 2-year extension with Pittsburgh, along with fellow players Scott Wilson, and Tom Kühnhackl. On May 26, 2016, at the NHL Eastern Conference Finals, Rust became the 8th rookie in history to get multiple goals in a game 7.

On December 5, 2016, Rust first recorded his first career hat-trick in an 8–5 win over the Ottawa Senators.

On April 20, 2017, Rust scored two pivotal goals, including the game-winner, in Game 5 of the Eastern Conference First Round meeting between the Penguins and the Blue Jackets. The Penguins ultimately won the game 5–2, and the series 4–1. He later went on to score the game (and series) winning goal in Game 7 of the Penguins next playoff series against the Washington Capitals. He has since been dubbed by Penguins fans as "Mr. Elimination" after scoring goals in game sevens.

As a pending free agent after the 2017–18 season, Rust recorded career highs in assists and points. He helped propel the Penguins to the 2018 Stanley Cup playoffs, where they would lose in the second round to the Washington Capitals. On June 26, 2018, Rust signed a four-year contract to stay with the Penguins. The contract carries an annual average value of $3.5 million.

On May 1, 2021, Rust scored his 99th and 100th NHL goals in a game against the Washington Capitals.

On May 22, 2022, in his final year of his four-year deal. Rust signed a six-year $30.75 million extension with the Penguins.

Personal life
Rust is the younger brother of retired AHL player Matt Rust who also played for the Wilkes-Barre Scranton Penguins during the 2011–12 AHL season. Rust, also known as Rusty, has a mild speech impediment, but through his life he has learned to not let this affect his confidence. Rust graduated Notre Dame May 2014 with a degree in finance from the Mendoza College of Business.

Career statistics

Regular season and playoffs

International

Awards and honors

References

External links
 
Bryan Rust's junior statistics at Pointstreak Sites

1992 births
American men's ice hockey right wingers
Ice hockey players from Michigan
Living people
Notre Dame Fighting Irish men's ice hockey players
People from Novi, Michigan
Sportspeople from Pontiac, Michigan
Pittsburgh Penguins draft picks
Pittsburgh Penguins players
Stanley Cup champions
Wilkes-Barre/Scranton Penguins players